The Girl in the Dark is a 1918 American silent mystery film directed by Stuart Paton. The script was written by Albert Kenyon, based on the 1914 novel The Green Seal by Charles Edmonds Walk.

Plot 
A young woman named Lois who was branded with Chinese letters on her shoulder as a baby finds herself attracting nefarious attention as she grows older.

Cast 
 Carmel Myers as Lois Fox
 Ashton Dearholt as Brice Ferris
 Frank Tokunaga as Ming
 Frank Deshon as Lao Wing
 Harry Carter as Strang
 Alfred Allen as Chief of Police Struber
 Betty Schade as Sally

Preservation
With no copies of The Girl in the Dark held in any film archives, it is a lost film.

References

External links

1918 films
American black-and-white films
Universal Pictures films
American silent feature films
Films directed by Stuart Paton
1910s American films
Silent mystery films
American mystery films
1918 mystery films